Fiero may refer to:

People 
 Conro Fiero (fl. 1910), American orcharder - see Conro Fiero House
 Joshua Fiero Jr. (1818–1886), American politician
 Patricia Fiero (born 1941), American politician

Vehicles 
 Pontiac Fiero, American sports car
 TVS Fiero, Indian motorcycle

Other 
 The Fieros, American rock group
 Martini Fiero, brand of vermouth

See also 
 Fierro (disambiguation)